Frank Morris (29 November 1878 – 25 January 1925) was a Canadian sports shooter. He competed in the 1000 yard free rifle event at the 1908 Summer Olympics.

References

1878 births
1925 deaths
English emigrants to Canada
Canadian male sport shooters
Olympic shooters of Canada
Shooters at the 1908 Summer Olympics
People from Shanklin